James Lawrence Pugh (December 12, 1820March 9, 1907) was a U.S. senator from Alabama, as well as a member of the Confederate Congress during the American Civil War.

Biography 

Pugh was born in Burke County, Georgia, and moved to Alabama in 1824.  He received a collegiate education, studied law under John Gill Shorter, and was admitted to the bar in 1841.  He began to practise in Eufaula, Alabama. He was a presidential elector in 1848 and 1856. He represented Alabama's second district as a Democrat in the United States House of Representatives from December 5, 1859, until January 21, 1861, when he retired upon the secession of his state.

He then served as an officer in the Confederate States Army.  He was subsequently elected to be the representative from Alabama's 8th District to both the First Confederate Congress and the Second Confederate Congress, serving from February 22, 1862, until the surrender in 1865. Pugh served on the House Committee on Military Affairs throughout both Congresses, where he was a prominent critic of C.S. President Jefferson Davis.

Following the war, he returned to his law practice. Upon the restoration of his citizenship, Pugh was president of the Democratic state convention of 1874, a delegate to the 1875 state constitutional convention, and a presidential elector again in 1876.  He was elected to fill the term left by the death of George S. Houston, and was reelected twice, serving in the Senate from November 24, 1880, to March 4, 1897. He lost renomination.

Notes

References
  Retrieved on April 20, 2009
  This source says he served as a private in the Confederate army.
 Political Graveyard

External links
 

1820 births
1907 deaths
Members of the Confederate House of Representatives from Alabama
Confederate States Army officers
Democratic Party United States senators from Alabama
Democratic Party members of the United States House of Representatives from Alabama
1848 United States presidential electors
1856 United States presidential electors
1876 United States presidential electors